Smith Spangler Turner (November 21, 1842 – April 8, 1898) was a U.S. Representative from Virginia.

Biography
Turner was born in Warren County, Virginia. He was a cadet at the Virginia Military Institute, Lexington, Virginia, when the Civil War commenced, and was subsequently given an honorary diploma. He enlisted in the Confederate States Army in 1861.
He served with General Stonewall Jackson as drill officer. He was an officer of George Pickett's division during the remainder of the war.
He taught mathematics in a female seminary in Winchester, Virginia from 1865 to 1867.
He studied law.
He was admitted to the bar in 1869 and commenced practice in Front Royal, Virginia.
He served as member of the Virginia House of Delegates from 1869 to 1872.
He served as prosecuting attorney for Warren County, Virginia from 1874 to 1879.
He served as member of the State board of visitors of the Virginia Military Institute for eight years.

Turner was elected as a Democrat to the Fifty-third Congress to fill the vacancy caused by the resignation of Charles T. O'Ferrall.
He was reelected to the Fifty-fourth Congress and served from January 30, 1894, to March 3, 1897.
He was not a candidate for renomination in 1896.
He died in Front Royal, Virginia, April 8, 1898.
He was interred in Prospect Hill Cemetery.

1894 election

Turner was elected to the U.S. House of Representatives in a special election unopposed.  He was later re-elected in the general election with 52.12% of the vote, defeating Republican Robert J. Walker, Populist Jacob S. Hopkins, and Independent G.T. Barbee.

Sources

1842 births
1898 deaths
Confederate States Army officers
Virginia lawyers
People from Front Royal, Virginia
Democratic Party members of the United States House of Representatives from Virginia
19th-century American politicians
19th-century American lawyers